Arewa or Arewaland is a Hausa word which means  "The North". The term is used to refer to Northern Nigeria general.

The continued use of the term, Arewa ...  has conjured up an image among educated Northerners that resonated far beyond the institutional structures Sir Ahmadu Bello created: the successor to the Bornu and Sokoto Caliphate; the vision of God's Empire in the region; the universality of its claim to suzerainty; and in a more prosaic but no less powerful sense, the concept of a polity with an emphasis on unity and sense of shared purpose in northern West Africa beyond the popular slogan--'one North, one People'. 

In the history of Nigeria specifically, it is used to refer to the pre-1967 Northern Region, Nigeria. In Niger, it has a very specific meaning: a small pre-colonial animist dominated state of the Dallol Maouri valley, known for the indigenous "Maouri"/"Mawri" Hausa culture. In Nigeria, some towns have been called simply "Arewa" in the past, before British colonisation.

Usage
In post independence Nigeria, some use the word as a general term for Nigerian Hausaland: a contraction of "Arewacin Nijeriya" (Northern Nigeria). Much of the north was once politically united in the Northern Region, a multi-ethnic entity, and was previously home of the seven Hausa states, later the Sokoto Caliphate in the pre-colonial period, and the Northern Nigeria Protectorate under British colonial rule.
 
Northern Nigeria regionalist groups, such as the Arewa Consultative Forum, and the related Arewa House are examples of this. These groups do not advocate independence from Nigeria, albeit, focus on unity of the Hausa–Fulani which forms the majority in the north. And as such, the term has become synonymous with machinations in lieu of extending political and cultural hegemony to capture the federal state.

References

History of Nigeria
Geography of Nigeria
History of Niger
Geography of Niger
Regions of Africa